Snow Creek may refer to:

Communities
Snow Creek, California, an unincorporated community in Riverside County
Darrah, California, an unincorporated community formerly known as Snow Creek
Snow Creek Township, Stokes County, North Carolina

Water resources
Snow Creek, a tributary of the Whitewater River in California
Snow Creek Falls, Yosemite National Park, California
Snow Creek (Mahantango Creek tributary) in Northumberland County, Pennsylvania
Snow Creek (Missouri), a stream in Missouri
Snow Creek (Washington state), a tributary of Icicle Creek
Snow Creek Glacier, Wenatchee National Forest, Washington State

Other uses
Snow Creek Methodist Church and Burying Ground, near Statesville, Iredell County, North Carolina, on the National Register of Historic Places
Snow Creek (ski resort), in Missouri
Snow Creek Placer Claim No. 1 in the Cape Nome Mining District Discovery Sites in Alaska

See also
Snow River in Alaska
Snow River (New Zealand)
Snowy River (disambiguation)